Odd Man Out: Readings of the Work and Reputation of Edgar Degas is a 1991 book by Carol Armstrong. It is about the paradoxes surrounding Edgar Degas and his works.

Contents
1. Degas, the Odd Man Out: The Impressionistic Exhibitions
2. Duranty on Degas: A Theory of Modern Painting
3. Reading the Work of Degas
4. Against the Grain: J.K. Huysmans and the 1886 Series of Nudes
5. The Myth of Degas

Publication history
1986, United States, Princeton University OCLC Number 229487323, 472 leaves, Thesis/dissertation manuscript
1991, United States, University of Chicago Press , hardback, 299 pages
2003, United States, Getty Publications , paperback, 300

Reception
Odd Man Out has been reviewed by Art History, The Art Bulletin, The French Review, and The Burlington Magazine.

It won the 1993 Charles Rufus Morey Book Award.

References

1991 non-fiction books
American non-fiction books
Books about artists
Art criticism
Edgar Degas